Thiosulfurous acid (HS−S(=O)−OH) is a hypothetical compound with the formula S2(OH)2. Attempted synthesis leads to polymers. It is a low oxidation state (+1) sulfur acid. It is the equivalent acid for disulfur monoxide. Salts derived from thiosulfurous acid, which are also unknown, are named "thiosulfites" or "sulfurothioites".

Other possible isomers are dihydroxydisulfane or hypodithionous acid HOSSOH, a linear chain, and thiothionyl hydroxide (S=S(OH)2) a tautomer where the hydrogen has moved from a sulfur to an oxygen. HOSSOH can have two different rotamers with symmetry C1 and C2.  The isomer with one hydrogen on sulfur and one on oxygen is the most stable according to calculations.

Reactions
It apparently decomposes to polysulfane oxide or polythionic acids in water, which is termed Wakenroder's liquid.

In alkaline conditions thiosulfurous acid rapidly deteriorates forming a mixture of sulfide, sulfur, sulfite, and thiosulfate.  In acidic conditions it will form hydrogen sulfide and sulfur dioxide as well.  Some of these react to form pentathionate and other polythionates. Thiosulfurous acid reacts with sulfurous acid to give tetrathionate, and with thiosulfuric acid to make hexathionate.

Esters
Four isomers are possible for R2S2O2, at least restricting sulfur to di- and tetravalency: (RO)2S=S, ROSSOR, RS(O)2SR, and RS(O)SOR.  For the first two, the R groups are equivalent, and in the latter two they are nonequivalent. A simple example is diethylthiosulfite, (EtO)2S=S. It is also known as diethylthionosulfite.  It is a stereochemically rigid on the NMR timescale to about 140 °C, somewhat similar to diethylsulfoxide.  Many derivatives have been prepared from glycols.  From meso-hydrobenzoin (PhCH(OH)−CH(OH)Ph), one obtains two isomers; a third isomer results from d,l-PhCH(OH)−CH(OH)Ph.

The reaction with simple alkoxide sources with disulfur dichloride gives the unbranched ROSSOR.  They are immiscible in water, but dissolve in benzene or carbon tetrachloride.  These species are less rigid than the thiosulfite esters.

References

Sulfur oxoacids